This is a list of Major League Baseball general managers.

List
Several of these general managers operate with the titles of "president of baseball operations" in addition to general manager. Others, while maintaining the title of general manager, are subordinate to presidents of baseball operations who have final authority on team personnel decisions. For example, Cardinals GM Mike Girsch reports to former GM and current president of baseball operations John Mozeliak and Red Sox GM Brian O'Halloran reports to chief baseball officer Chaim Bloom. Similar relationships appear to exist in Minnesota (Thad Levine reporting to Derek Falvey), Tampa Bay (Peter Bendix to Erik Neander), Cleveland (Mike Chernoff to Chris Antonetti), Philadelphia (Sam Fuld to Dave Dombrowski), Kansas City (J. J. Picollo to Dayton Moore), Texas (Chris Young to Jon Daniels), the Los Angeles Dodgers (Brandon Gomes to Andrew Friedman), the Chicago Cubs (Carter Hawkins to Jed Hoyer), and Cincinnati (Nick Krall to Dick Williams). GM-president responsibilities with the Athletics (David Forst and Billy Beane), the Blue Jays (Ross Atkins and Mark Shapiro), the Mets (Billy Eppler and Sandy Alderson), the Brewers (Matt Arnold and David Stearns), and the White Sox (Rick Hahn and Kenny Williams) are less clear in terms of who holds the highest authority.

See also

List of Major League Baseball principal owners
List of Major League Baseball managers

Notes

References